Heartaches by the Number may refer to:

"Heartaches by the Number", a 1959 popular country music song
Heartaches by the Number (Waylon Jennings album)
Heartaches by the Number (David Ball album)